Jüri Saar (born 1946) is an Estonian politician. He was a member of X Riigikogu.

He has been a member of People's Union of Estonia.

References

Living people
1946 births
Members of the Riigikogu, 2003–2007
Place of birth missing (living people)
Date of birth missing (living people)